Sovereignty Restoration Day is a national holiday of the former Hawaiian Kingdom celebrated on July 31 and still commemorated by Native Hawaiians in the state of Hawaii. It honors the restoration of sovereignty to the kingdom, following the occupation of Hawaiʻi by Great Britain during the 1843 Paulet Affair, by British Rear-Admiral Richard Darton Thomas and when King Kamehameha III uttered the phrase: Ua Mau ke Ea o ka ʻĀina i ka Pono ("The life of the land is preserved in the righteousness of the people").

During the monarchy, the holiday was observed annually by the native and foreign communities in Hawaii. King Kamehameha V, who deemed the holiday inappropriate, officially dropped it as a national holiday in 1867 and replaced with Kamehameha Day (on June 11). It was briefly revived as a national holiday from 1891 until the overthrow of the Hawaiian Kingdom in 1893. During the ensuing years of the 1890s, the holiday continued to be observed privately by loyalists of the monarchy as a form of opposition and resistance. It is still celebrated by proponents of the Hawaiian sovereignty movement as a day of resistance against what sovereignty advocates consider an ongoing American occupation of Hawaiʻi. In 2022, the day was recognized by the State of Hawaii as a special day of remembrance.

Background 

On February 10, 1843, Captain Lord George Paulet, of  landed in Honolulu in response to the complaints by the British Consul in Honolulu Richard Charlton, who had an underlying land dispute with the Hawaiian government, and claimed British subjects were being denied their legal rights. Paulet, without the authorization of his superiors, unilaterally occupied the kingdom in the name of Queen Victoria on February 25 despite the protests of Hawaiian King Kamehameha III and his ministers. The Hawaiian king ceded his sovereignty under protest to the British government. Paulet placed himself and a committee in charge, restricted trade in the ports, destroyed all Hawaiian flags that could be found, and raised the British Union Jack in their place.

After a five-month occupation, Rear-Admiral Richard Darton Thomas, the Commander-in-Chief of the Pacific Station, sailed into Honolulu on his flagship  on July 26, 1843, and requested an interview with the king. Kamehameha III was more than happy to tell his side of the story, and a new treaty was negotiated with the British giving British subjects on the islands "perfect equality with the most favored foreigners".

On July 31, 1843, Thomas raised the Hawaiian flag in place of the Union Jack at the plains east of Honolulu (now part of downtown Honolulu), formally ending the occupation, and gave a speech affirming the independence and sovereignty of the Hawaiian kingdom and the friendship of the British government.
The site of the ceremony was later made into a park in honor of the event and named Thomas Square.

Official observation 

Following the restoration of sovereignty at Thomas Square, King Kamehameha III held an afternoon thanksgiving service at Kawaiahaʻo Church where he uttered the phrase: Ua Mau ke Ea o ka ʻĀina i ka Pono ("The life of the land is preserved in the righteousness of the people"). This phrase was adopted in 1959 as the motto of the state of Hawaii.
The king declared a ten-day holiday and the entire community including foreigners and native Hawaiians rejoiced in festivities with a lavish luau of suckling pig, fish and poi. The event was later made into an annual holiday and was observed by his successor King Kamehameha IV (1855–1864). During the fourth anniversary of the restoration in 1847, King Kamehameha III and his wife Queen Kalama hosted a grand luau at their summer palace, Kaniakapupu, attended by an estimated ten thousand guests.

During the latter part of the reign of King Kamehameha V (1864–1872) the celebration was deemed inappropriate by the king and his ministers since it brought back unpleasant memories of the British occupation by Paulet, and the official holiday was discontinued. The holiday was still being officially sanctioned in 1865 and 1866. No public celebration was held in 1867, and it ceased to be officially observed. There are also later assertions that the holiday was dropped "to suit the delicate feelings of a few Englishmen who did not like the memory of these events revived".
However, the anniversary was still remembered by people in private.
In 1872, the king replaced the holiday with Kamehameha Day (on June 11) to honor his grandfather Kamehameha I who had conquered and united the Hawaiian Islands in 1810. This is the only holiday from the time of the Hawaiian monarchy that remains an official holiday of the state of Hawaii.

The 1890 session of the Hawaiian legislature briefly restored the date as a national holiday effective July 31, 1891, during the reign of Queen Liliuokalani. In 1893, the Hawaiian monarchy was overthrown and the queen yielded her authority to the United States government under protest. The Provisional Government of Hawaii, which was established as an interim regime while a treaty of annexation was being pushed through the United States Congress, abolished the holiday. Private observance of the fiftieth anniversary on July 31, 1893, was watched by the oligarchical government with an air of suspicion, while royalists and supporters of the deposed queen hoped in vain for another restoration to occur. After 1893, the holiday continued to be observed privately by loyalists of the monarchy as a form of opposition and resistance.
By the time the Territory of Hawaii was organized in 1898 the holiday had become a historical footnote.

Modern-day observation 

The tradition of this celebration was revived in 1985 by Hawaiian sovereignty movement activist Kekuni Blaisdell during the Hawaiian Renaissance.
Today, the holiday is upheld by proponents of the Hawaiian sovereignty movement who compare the British occupation of 1843 to what they believe is the ongoing modern American occupation of the islands and believe the United States government should "follow the example of the British to restore the Hawaiian nation". In Honolulu, the holiday is marked by the celebration of Hawaiian culture, history and activism through organized speeches, presentations, marches, hula performances, music rallies and flag-raising. On the other islands, sovereignty groups organize historical reenactments, rallies, and the ceremonial raising of the Hawaiian flag in place of the American flag.

On July 31, 2018, a 12-foot bronze statue of Kamehameha III and a flagpole flying the Hawaiian flag was unveiled at Thomas Square in a ceremony honoring the 175th anniversary of the restoration of Hawaiian sovereignty in 1843. The statue was created by Oregon artist Thomas Jay Warren for $250,000 allotted by the Mayor's Office of Culture and the Arts and is part of Mayor Kirk Caldwell's plans to revamp the park. Thomas Square is one of four sites in Hawaii where the Hawaiian flag is allowed to fly alone without the United States flag. The others are the Royal Mausoleum at Mauna ʻAla, ʻIolani Palace and Puʻuhonua o Hōnaunau.

In 2022, the State of Hawaii passed a legislative bill officially recognizing Lā Hoʻihoʻi Ea as a special day of observance.

References

Bibliography 
 

 

Celebrations in Hawaii
July observances
1843 establishments in Hawaii
Hawaiian sovereignty movement